Anna Kurek, née Grejman (born 8 June 1993) is a Polish volleyball player, a member of Poland women's national volleyball team and Polish club Polski Cukier Muszyna, 2014 Polish Champion.

Career

Clubs
In season 2013/14 she achieved Polish Cup and her first title of Polish Champion with KPS Chemik Police. Then she moved to Impel Wrocław and was its player for one season. In 2015, she went to Polski Cukier Muszyna.

National team
She was a member of Poland U20 national team. On 2010 Junior European Championship she took with her national team 10th place and then on 2011 FIVB U20 World Championship took 9th place. In senior Polish national team she debuted on June 26, 2013 during the match with Cuba on 2013 Boris Yeltsin Cup.

Personal life
She was born in Szczecin. Grejman is married to notable Polish volleyball player Bartosz Kurek.

Sporting achievements

National championships
 2013/2014  Polish Cup, with KPS Chemik Police
 2013/2014  Polish Championship, with KPS Chemik Police

References

External links
 FIVB profile

1993 births
Living people
Sportspeople from Szczecin
Polish women's volleyball players